Mama The Idol is a South Korean reality show program which premiered on tvN on December 10, 2021 and aired every Friday at 20:40 (KST) until February 4, 2022.

Synopsis
A reality show surrounding six female idols who had chosen to leave the stage to become mothers. Through various trainings and evaluations (plus fulfilling the criteria of more than 20,000 followers on Instagram and more than 2,000 members in the show's fancafe in 1 month), they return to stand on stage again to perform, debuting together as an idol group M.M.D (마마돌).

Cast

Main
 Kahi
 Park Jung-ah
 Byul
 Yang Eun-ji
 Hyun Jyu-ni
 Sunye

Comeback Summon Squad
 Hong Jin-kyung
 Do Kyung-wan
 Cho Seung-youn
 Lee Chan-won

Comeback Masters
 Vocal Mentors
 Park Sun-joo
 Han Won-jong
 Choreographers
 Bae Yoon-jung
 Lia Kim
 J Black
 Mmary
 LoveRan
 Music Producers
 Seo Yong-bae
 Kim Do-hoon

Idol Cheering Squad

Episodes

Ratings

Notes

References

External links
  

South Korean reality television series
2021 South Korean television series debuts
Korean-language television shows
South Korean television shows